Ramtole रामटोल is a small neighborhood located in Birgunj, Nepal which is the main part of Ward no.7 of Birgunj. It is close to Maisthan Temple and is home to people of diverse castes and origin, for example Nepali (Bahun, Newar), Muslim, Madeshi, Marwadi, Dom and Indian origin. Previously, Ramtole was known as kaichiya tole (scissors tole) because most of the people of middle class from Ramtole used to make bidi (cigarettes) by the use of scissors. Scissors were used to cut leaf to make bidi. Sometimes the eastern part of Ramtole was also known as khalka tole (low land).

There is the one and only MAA SANTHOSHI TEMPLE in Birgunj or even in Nepal. There are also Hanuman Mandir, Krisha mandir and other small temples at Ramtole. It is a well plotted tole in Old Birgunj.
There is one old dharmashala in Ramtole.

Ramtole is attached by Railway Road which is east to Ramtole. There is Gahawa, Kumhaltole and road no.3 (Maisthan) respectively to the north, south and west to Ramtole. There are two straight streets in Ramtole which are connected with five sub-streets (galli) with each other.

There is Maisthan Vidyapith School, Kanchanjunga School, Merigold School, Gahawa school (Dhobiya School) at Ramtole.

References

Populated places in Parsa District